There are three townlands with the name Newtown, in the Barony of Middle Third in County Tipperary, Ireland. 
Newtown in the civil parish of Erry
Newtown in the civil parish of Baptistgrange
Newtown in the civil parish of Knockgraffon
There are nineteen townlands known as Newtown in the whole of County Tipperary.

References

Townlands of County Tipperary